Wouter Hardy (born 3 April 1991), also known by his stage name HRDY, is a Dutch musician, songwriter and producer. He is known for his work with, among others, Duncan Laurence and Gjon's Tears.

Career 
Hardy was born and raised in Boxtel, North Brabant. After graduating from the Rock City Institute in Eindhoven, he moved to Rotterdam to study at the Codarts University for the Arts. During his studies, he joined the band of Sharon Kovacs, with whom he toured through Europe until 2016.

In late 2016, Hardy met Duncan Laurence through Sony Music Publishing. Together, they worked on the song "Arcade" for two years. Prior to its public release, the song was internally selected by the Dutch broadcaster AVROTROS to represent the Netherlands in the Eurovision Song Contest 2019. "Arcade" went on to win the competition, giving the Netherlands its first Eurovision win since 1975, and became one of the most successful Eurovision Song Contest winning entries on streaming platforms and international charts in recent history.

Following the cancellation of the Eurovision Song Contest 2020, Hardy was invited to participate in a songwriting camp in Zürich to help write a new song for the Swiss representative Gjon's Tears for the 2021 edition. Together with Gjon's Tears and the Belgian songwriter Nina Sampermans, he wrote the song "Ground Zero", which was later translated into French as "Tout l'univers". Out of five finalists, a professional jury ultimately chose this song to represent Switzerland in the Eurovision Song Contest 2021. At Eurovision, the entry finished in third place with 432 points, Switzerland's best placement since 1993.

Discography

Extended plays

Singles

Songwriting discography

Eurovision Song Contest entries

References 

1991 births
21st-century Dutch composers
21st-century male musicians
Codarts University for the Arts alumni
Academic staff of Codarts University for the Arts
Dutch composers
Dutch keyboardists
Dutch pianists
Dutch record producers
Dutch songwriters
Dutch trumpeters
Eurovision Song Contest winners
Living people
Music directors
Musicians from North Brabant
People from Boxtel
Sound designers